The Philippines Open (also known as Philippines International Darts Open) is a darts tournament held in Manila, Philippines. First edition of this tournament took place in 1992. The last edition took place in December 2011. The first winners of this tournament were Armando Diaz and Paulita Villanueva. Villanueva is also the most successful player, winning six tournaments in a row.

Results

Men's

References

2006 establishments in the Philippines
Darts tournaments